SPARC is a tokamak under development by Commonwealth Fusion Systems (CFS) in collaboration with the Massachusetts Institute of Technology (MIT) Plasma Science and Fusion Center (PSFC). Funding has come from Eni, Breakthrough Energy Ventures, Khosla Ventures, Temasek, Equinor, Devonshire Investors, and others.

SPARC plans to verify the technology and physics required to build a power plant based on the ARC fusion power plant concept. SPARC is designed to achieve this with margin in excess of  breakeven and may be capable of achieving up to 140 MW of fusion power for 10 second bursts despite its relatively compact size.

The project is on schedule for operation in 2025 after completing a magnet test in 2021.

History 
The SPARC project was announced in 2018 with a planned completion in 2025. In March 2021, CFS announced that it planned to build SPARC at its campus in Devens, Massachusetts.

In September 2021 the project successfully tested a prototype high-field coil, achieving a record for high-temperature superconducting magnets, with a field strength of 20 T at the temperature of 20 K.

Technology 
SPARC uses yttrium barium copper oxide (YBCO) high-temperature superconducting magnets that retain superconductivity at temperatures as high as 77 K (optimally at 10 K). The resulting plasmas are expected to generate at least twice as much energy as is required to sustain themselves at high temperatures (200 million K), giving a fusion gain Q > 2, with an expected Q ≈ 11.

References

External links 
 
 SPARC on CFS site

Tokamaks
Proposed fusion reactors